Bennachie (Scottish Gaelic: Beinn na Cìche) is a range of hills in Aberdeenshire, Scotland. Though not particularly high, compared to other peaks within Scotland, the mountain is very prominent, owing to its isolation and the relative flatness of the surrounding terrain, and dominates the skyline from several viewpoints.

The peak that stands out the most visually is Mither Tap (518 m, 1699 feet) and from its top there are good views of the county to the north and east. Most of the tops lie along an east / west ridge, with the exception of Millstone Hill (409 m) an outlier or spur which is separated from and to the south of the main ridge. Mither Tap has an Iron Age fort on its summit. Unlike with many other hilltop forts in the area, there are no signs of vitrification in the stone. Bennachie is visible from a number of distant points; to the north it is visible from Longman Hill, a point considerably to the north.

History 

Some believe that the peak had religious significance to the Bronze Age people who inhabited this area. This theory is supported by the large number of standing stones in the surrounding area. The significance is believed  to be connected to the profile of the hill, which is shaped like a female breast, which is reflected in the name "Mither Tap" (Mother Top) and "Bennachie" (Beinn na Ciche: 'hill of the breast').  It has been suggested as a possible site of the battle of Mons Graupius.  An alternative Gaelic etymology from *Beinn a' Chath, i.e. 'hill of the battle', is perhaps a possibility.

From 1800 to 1859 common land on the east side of Bennachie was home to a community of squatters known locally as the Colony. A small number of families led a crofting life often doing skilled work, such as dyking and quarrying, for local landowners. After 1859 the Colony dwindled as the common land was broken up and divided amongst the local estates. However, the last of the original colonists, George Esson, lived on the hill until his death in the 1930s. Visitors to Bennachie can explore the remains of the Colony and extensive work is being done on site and amongst local parish records to determine the history of the Colonists.

Mither Tap has an astronomical alignment with the nearby Pictish Fortalice of Caskieben (currently located within Keith Hall). Dr. Arthur Johnston said "the hill of Benochie, a conical elevation about eight miles distant, casts its shadow over Caskieben at the periods of the equinox."

Paths and environment 

The range of hills is a popular destination for walkers since it is relatively close to Aberdeen. The Gordon Way is a waymarked trail that traverses the Southern flank of Bennachie between the Visitors Centre in the East and Suie Car Park to the West. Most of the Bennachie range is owned by Forestry and Land Scotland, which maintains a network of paths on and around the hills, several car parks and a visitor centre located at the eastern foot of the range. A volunteer conservation charity, the Bailies of Bennachie, founded in 1973, helps with this work and with other environmental and archaeological activities on the hill. There are several marked paths, including fairly easy ascents of Oxen Craig and Mither Tap that start from the centre.

See also
Macaulayite, a mineral known from only one place in the world, at the foot of Bennachie.
Breast-shaped hill
Christian Maclagan

Gallery

References

External links

 Computer-generated virtual panoramas Oxen Craig Index
 Flickr Group devoted to Bennachie photos Flickr Bennachie Group
 Forestry Commission Website for Bennachie
 Bailies of Bennachie a Bennachie Voluntary Conservation Society Bailies of Bennachie
Stuart McHardy, The Goddess in the Landscape of Scotland
 Virtual Tour of Mither Tap

Marilyns of Scotland
Mountains and hills of the Eastern Highlands
Mountains and hills of Aberdeenshire
Archaeological sites in Aberdeenshire
Hill forts in Scotland
Bronze Age sites in Scotland
Iron Age sites in Scotland
Scheduled monuments in Scotland
Mountains and hills of the United Kingdom with toposcopes